The following highways are numbered 34: for a list of roads numbered N34 : see list of N34 roads.

International
 Asian Highway 34
 European route E34

Australia
 Cox Peninsula Road (Northern Territory)
 (Sydney)
 Maroondah Highway (Victoria)

Canada
 Alberta Highway 34 (defunct)
 Manitoba Highway 34
 Ontario Highway 34
 Saskatchewan Highway 34

Costa Rica
 National Route 34

Czech Republic
 part of  I/34 Highway; Czech: Silnice I/34

India
  National Highway 34 (India)

Israel
Highway 34 (Israel)

Italy
 Autostrada A34

Japan
 Japan National Route 34
 Nagasaki Expressway
 Ōita Expressway

Korea, South
 National Route 34

New Zealand
 New Zealand State Highway 34

Thailand 

  Highway 34 (Debaratana Road)

United Kingdom
 British A34 (Winchester-Salford)

United States
 U.S. Route 34
 Alabama State Route 34
 California State Route 34
 County Route J34 (California)
 County Route S34 (California)
 Connecticut Route 34
 Delaware Route 34 (former)
 Georgia State Route 34
 Georgia State Route 34 (1919–1926) (former)
Hawaii Route 34 (former)
 Idaho State Highway 34
 Illinois Route 34
 Indiana State Road 34 (former)
 K-34 (Kansas highway)
 Kentucky Route 34
 Louisiana Highway 34
 Maryland Route 34
 M-34 (Michigan highway)
 Minnesota State Highway 34
 County Road 34 (Hennepin County, Minnesota)
 County Road 34 (Ramsey County, Minnesota)
 Missouri Route 34
 Nebraska Highway 34 (former)
 Nebraska Link 34H
 Nebraska Spur 34C
 Nebraska Spur 34D
 Nebraska Recreation Road 34J
 Nebraska Recreation Road 34K
 Nebraska Recreation Road 34L
 Nevada State Route 34 (former)
 New Jersey Route 34
 County Route 34 (Bergen County, New Jersey)
 County Route 34 (Monmouth County, New Jersey)
 New Mexico State Road 34
 New York State Route 34
 County Route 34 (Cayuga County, New York)
 County Route 34 (Chautauqua County, New York)
 County Route 34 (Clinton County, New York)
 County Route 34 (Dutchess County, New York)
 County Route 34 (Erie County, New York)
 County Route 34 (Genesee County, New York)
 County Route 34 (Madison County, New York)
 County Route 34 (Onondaga County, New York)
 County Route 34 (Orange County, New York)
 County Route 34 (Oswego County, New York)
 County Route 34 (Otsego County, New York)
 County Route 34 (Putnam County, New York)
 County Route 34 (Schenectady County, New York)
 County Route 34 (St. Lawrence County, New York)
 County Route 34 (Steuben County, New York)
 County Route 34 (Suffolk County, New York)
 County Route 34 (Ulster County, New York)
 County Route 34 (Warren County, New York)
 North Carolina Highway 34
 North Dakota Highway 34
 Ohio State Route 34
 Oklahoma State Highway 34
 Oklahoma State Highway 34C
 Oregon Route 34
 Pennsylvania Route 34
 South Carolina Highway 34
 South Dakota Highway 34
 Tennessee State Route 34
 Texas State Highway 34
 Texas State Highway Loop 34
 Farm to Market Road 34
 Texas Park Road 34
 Utah State Route 34
 Virginia State Route 34
 Virginia State Route 34 (1923-1933) (former)
 Virginia State Route 34 (1933-1940) (former)
 West Virginia Route 34
 Wisconsin Highway 34
 Wyoming Highway 34

Territories
 Guam Highway 34
 Puerto Rico Highway 34

See also
A34 (disambiguation)#Roads
List of highways numbered 34A
List of highways numbered 34B